The Anaheim Ducks are an American professional ice hockey team based in Anaheim, California. They play in the Pacific Division of the Western Conference in the National Hockey League (NHL). The franchise was founded in 1993 by The Walt Disney Company as the Mighty Ducks of Anaheim, based on the film The Mighty Ducks. They were then renamed the Anaheim Ducks before the 2006–07 season, in which the Ducks won their first Stanley Cup championship. The Ducks have played their home games at the Honda Center, formerly known as the Anaheim Arena (1993) and the Arrowhead Pond of Anaheim (1993-2006), since their inaugural season. The Ducks are owned by Henry Samueli and his wife Susan, Pat Verbeek is their general manager, and Ryan Getzlaf was the team captain until his retirement after the 2021-22 season. The Ducks currently do not have a team captain, rather three alternates.

There have been 10 head coaches for the franchise. The Mighty Ducks's first head coach was Ron Wilson, who coached for four seasons. Randy Carlyle is the franchise's all-time leader for the most regular-season games coached, regular-season game wins, regular-season points, playoff games coached and playoff-game wins. Carlyle is the only Ducks head coach to have won the Stanley Cup. Carlyle was relieved of his coaching duties in Anaheim on November 30, 2011, and the franchise immediately hired former Washington Capitals coach Bruce Boudreau. Boudreau was released after the 2015–16 season. The franchise rehired Randy Carlyle prior to the 2016–17 season, for his second stint with the organization. After struggling to win games in the 2018–19 season, Carlyle was relieved on February 10, 2019. The franchise's general manager, Bob Murray, replaced Carlyle as an interim coach to finish the 2018–19 season. After the conclusion of the season, Dallas Eakins was hired on June 17, 2019. He spent time coaching the Anaheim Ducks affiliate team, the San Diego Gulls, before being brought up to coach the Ducks.

Key

Coaches

Note: Statistics are current through the end of the 2021–22 season.

Notes
 A running total of the number of coaches of the (Mighty) Ducks. Thus, any coach who has two or more separate terms as head coach is only counted once.
 Before the 2005–06 season, the NHL instituted a penalty shootout for regular season games that remained tied after a five-minute overtime period, which prevented ties.
 Each year is linked to an article about that particular NHL season.

References
General

Specific

Anaheim Ducks coaches
Anaheim Ducks head coaches
Head coaches